Herring are forage fish, mostly belonging to the family of Clupeidae.

Herring often move in large schools around fishing banks and near the coast, found particularly in shallow, temperate waters of the North Pacific and North Atlantic Oceans, including the Baltic Sea, as well as off the west coast of South America. Three species of Clupea (the type genus of the herring family Clupeidae) are recognised, and comprise about 90% of all herrings captured in fisheries. The most abundant of these species is the Atlantic herring, which comprises over half of all herring capture. Fish called herring are also found in the Arabian Sea, Indian Ocean, and Bay of Bengal.

Herring played an important role in the history of marine fisheries in Europe, and early in the 20th century, their study was fundamental to the development of fisheries science. These oily fish also have a long history as an important food fish, and are often salted, smoked, or pickled.

Herring are also known as "silver darlings".

Species

A number of different species, most belonging to the family Clupeidae, are commonly referred to as herrings. The origins of the term "herring" is somewhat unclear, though it may derive from the Old High German heri meaning a "host, multitude", in reference to the large schools they form.

The type genus of the herring family Clupeidae is Clupea. Clupea contains only two species: the Atlantic herring (the type species) found in the North Atlantic, and the Pacific herring mainly found in the North Pacific. Subspecific divisions have been suggested for both the Atlantic and Pacific herrings, but their biological basis remains unclear.

In addition, a number of related species, all in the Clupeidae, are commonly referred to as herrings. The table immediately below includes those members of the family Clupeidae referred to by FishBase as herrings which have been assessed by the International Union for Conservation of Nature.

Also, a number of other species are called herrings, which may be related to clupeids or just share some characteristics of herrings (such as the lake herring, which is a salmonid). Just which of these species are called herrings can vary with locality, so what might be called a herring in one locality might be called something else in another locality. Some examples:

Characteristics

The species of Clupea belong to the larger family Clupeidae (herrings, shads, sardines, menhadens), which comprises some 200 species that share similar features. These silvery-coloured fish have a single dorsal fin, which is soft, without spines. They have no lateral line and have a protruding lower jaw.

Lifecycle

At least one stock of Atlantic herring spawns in every month of the year. Each spawns at a different time and place (spring, summer, autumn, and winter herrings). Eggs are laid on the sea bed, on rock, stones, gravel, sand or beds of algae. Females may deposit from 20,000 to 40,000 eggs, according to age and size, averaging about 30,000. In sexually mature herring, the genital organs grow before spawning, reaching about one-fifth of its total weight.

The eggs sink to the bottom, where they stick in layers or clumps to gravel, seaweed, or stones, by means of their mucous coating, or to any other objects on which they chance to settle.

If the egg layers are too thick they suffer from oxygen depletion and often die, entangled in a maze of mucus. They need substantial water microturbulence, generally provided by wave action or coastal currents. Survival is highest in crevices and behind solid structures, because predators feast on openly exposed eggs. Eggs die at temperatures above .

Only the eyes are well pigmented. The rest of the body is nearly transparent, virtually invisible under water and in natural lighting conditions.

Herring larvae are very slender and can easily be distinguished from all other young fish of their range by the location of the vent, which lies close to the base of the tail; however, distinguishing clupeoids one from another in their early stages requires critical examination, especially telling herring from sprats.

Ecology

Prey

Herrings consume copepods, arrow worms, pelagic amphipods, mysids, and krill in the pelagic zone. Conversely, they are a central prey item or forage fish for higher trophic levels. The reasons for this success are still enigmatic; one speculation attributes their dominance to the huge, extremely fast cruising schools they inhabit.

Herring feed on phytoplankton, and as they mature, they start to consume larger organisms. They also feed on zooplankton, tiny animals found in oceanic surface waters, and small fish and fish larvae. Copepods and other tiny crustaceans are the most common zooplankton eaten by herring. During daylight, herring stay in the safety of deep water, feeding at the surface only at night when the chance of being seen by predators is less. They swim along with their mouths open, filtering the plankton from the water as it passes through their gills.
Young herring mostly hunt copepods individually, by means of "particulate feeding" or "raptorial feeding", a feeding method also used by adult herring on larger prey items like krill. If prey concentrations reach very high levels, as in microlayers, at fronts, or directly below the surface, herring become filter feeders, driving several meters forward with wide open mouth and far expanded opercula, then closing and cleaning the gill rakers for a few milliseconds.

Copepods, the primary zooplankton, are a major item on the forage fish menu. Some scientists say they form the largest animal biomass on the planet. Copepods are very alert and evasive. They have large antennae (see photo below left). When they spread their antennae, they can sense the pressure wave from an approaching fish and jump with great speed over a few centimetres. If copepod concentrations reach high levels, schooling herrings adopt a method called ram feeding. In the photo below, herring ram feed on a school of copepods. They swim with their mouths wide open and their operculae fully expanded.

The fish swim in a grid where the distance between them is the same as the jump length of their prey, as indicated in the animation above right. In the animation, juvenile herring hunt the copepods in this synchronised way. The copepods sense with their antennae the pressure wave of an approaching herring and react with a fast escape jump. The length of the jump is fairly constant. The fish align themselves in a grid with this characteristic jump length. A copepod can dart about 80 times before it tires. After a jump, it takes it 60 milliseconds to spread its antennae again, and this time delay becomes its undoing, as the almost endless stream of herring allows a herring to eventually snap up the copepod. A single juvenile herring could never catch a large copepod.

Other pelagic prey eaten by herring includes fish eggs, larval snails, diatoms by herring larvae below , tintinnids by larvae below , molluscan larvae, menhaden larvae, krill, mysids, smaller fishes, pteropods, annelids, Calanus spp., Centropagidae, and Meganyctiphanes norvegica.

Herrings, along with Atlantic cod and sprat, are the most important commercial species to humans in the Baltic Sea. The analysis of the stomach contents of these fish indicate Atlantic cod is the top predator, preying on the herring and sprat. Sprat are competitive with herring for the same food resources. This is evident in the two species' vertical migration in the Baltic Sea, where they compete for the limited zooplankton available and necessary for their survival. Sprat are highly selective in their diet and eat only zooplankton, while herring are more eclectic, adjusting their diet as they grow in size. In the Baltic, copepods of the genus Acartia can be present in large numbers. However, they are small in size with a high escape response, so herring and sprat avoid trying to catch them. These copepods also tend to dwell more in surface waters, whereas herring and sprat, especially during the day, tend to dwell in deeper waters.

Predators

Predators of herring include seabirds, marine mammals such as dolphins, porpoises, whales, seals, and sea lions, predatory fish such as sharks, billfish, tuna, salmon, striped bass, cod, and halibut. Fishermen also catch and eat herring.

The predators often cooperate in groups, using different techniques to panic or herd a school of herring into a tight bait ball. Different predatory species then use different techniques to pick the fish off in the bait ball. The sailfish raises its sail to make it appear much larger. Swordfish charge at high speed through the bait balls, slashing with their swords to kill or stun prey. They then turn and return to consume their "catch". Thresher sharks use their long tails to stun the shoaling fish. These sharks compact their prey school by swimming around them and splashing the water with their tails, often in pairs or small groups. They then strike them sharply with the upper lobe of their tails to stun them. Spinner sharks charge vertically through the school, spinning on their axes with their mouths open and snapping all around. The sharks' momentum at the end of these spiraling runs often carries them into the air.

Some whales lunge feed on bait balls. Lunge feeding is an extreme feeding method, where the whale accelerates from below the bait ball to a high velocity and then opens its mouth to a large gape angle. This generates the water pressure required to expand its mouth and engulf and filter a huge amount of water and fish. Lunge feeding by rorquals, a family of huge baleen whales that includes the blue whale, is said to be the largest biomechanical event on Earth.

Fisheries

Adult herring are harvested for their flesh and eggs, and they are often used as baitfish. The trade in herring is an important sector of many national economies. In Europe, the fish has been called the "silver of the sea", and its trade has been so significant to many countries that it has been regarded as the most commercially important fishery in history.

Environmental Defense have suggested that the Atlantic herring (Clupea harengus) fishery is an environmentally responsible fishery.

As food

Herring has been a staple food source since at least 3000 BC. The fish is served numerous ways, and many regional recipes are used: eaten raw, fermented, pickled, or cured by other techniques, such as being smoked as kippers.

Herring are very high in the long-chain omega-3 fatty acids EPA and DHA. They are a source of vitamin D.

Water pollution influences the amount of herring that may be safely consumed. For example, large Baltic herring slightly exceeds recommended limits with respect to PCB and dioxin, although some sources point out that the cancer-reducing effect of omega-3 fatty acids is statistically stronger than the carcinogenic effect of PCBs and dioxins. The contaminant levels depend on the age of the fish which can be inferred from their size. Baltic herrings larger than  may be eaten twice a month, while herrings smaller than 17 cm can be eaten freely. Mercury in fish also influences the amount of fish that women who are pregnant or planning to be pregnant within the next one or two years may safely eat.

History
The herring has played a highly significant role in history both socially and economically. During the Middle Ages, herring prompted the founding of Great Yarmouth, Amsterdam, and Copenhagen. In 1274, while on his deathbed at the monastery of Fossanova (south of Rome, Italy), when encouraged to eat something to regain his strength, Thomas Aquinas asked for fresh herring.

See also
Herringbone pattern

References

Citations

Sources 

 
 Dewhurst HW (1834)  Clupea harengis or the common herring In: The Natural History of the Order Cetacea, Oxford University. Pages 232–246.
 Geffen, Audrey J (2009) Advances in herring biology: from simple to complex, coping with plasticity and adaptability: ICES Journal of Marine Science, 66 (8): 1688–1695.
 Gilpen JB (1867) "On the common herring (Clupea elongata)" Proceedings and Transactions of the Nova-Scotian Institute of Natural Science, 1 (1): 4–11.
 O'Clair, Rita M. and O'Clair, Charles E., "Pacific herring," Southeast Alaska's Rocky Shores: Animals. pg. 343–346. Plant Press: Auke Bay, Alaska (1998). 
 Stephenson RL (2001) The role of herring investigations in shaping fisheries science In F. Funk, J. Blackburn, D. Hay, A.J. Paul, R. Stephen- son, R. Toresen, and D. Witherell (eds.) Herrings: Expectations for a New Millennium, Alaska Sea Grant College Program. AK-SG-01-04. pp. 1–20. .
 Stephenson, R. L., Melvin, G. D., and Power, M. J. (2009) "Population integrity and connectivity in Northwest Atlantic herring: a review of assumptions and evidence" ICES Journal of Marine Science, 66: 1733–1739.
 Whitehead PJP, Nelson GJ and Wongratana T (1988) FAO species catalogue, volume 2: Clupeoid Fishes of the World, Suborder Clupeoidei FAO Fisheries Synopsis 125, Rome. . Download ZIP (16 MB)

Further reading 
 Baltic Fisheries Cooperation Committee (1995) Utilization and Marketing of Baltic Herring Nordic Council of Ministers. .
 Bigelow HB and Schroeder WC (1953) Fishes of the Gulf of Maine Pages 88–100, Fishery Bulletin 74(53), NOAA. pdf version
 Dodd JS (1752) An essay toward a natural history of the herring Original from the New York Public Library.
 Mitchell JM (1864) The herring: its natural history and national importance Edmonston and Douglas. Original from the University of Wisconsin.
 Postan MM, Miller E and Habakkuk HJ (1987) The Cambridge Economic History of Europe: Trade and industry in the Middle Ages Cambridge University Press. .
 Poulsen B (2008) Dutch Herring: An Environmental History, C. 1600–1860 Amsterdam University Press. .
 Samuel AM (1918) The herring: its effect on the history of Britain J. Murray. Original from the University of Michigan.
 Stephenson F (2007) Herring Fishermen: Images of an Eastern North Carolina Tradition The History Press. .
 Waters B (1809) Letters upon the subject of the herring fishery: addressed to the secretary of the Honourable the Board for the Herring Fishery at Edinburgh, to which is added, a petition to the lords of the treasury on the same subject Original from Harvard University.

External links

 Herring "communicate" by flatulence from National Geographic (2003)
 Atlantic Herring from the Gulf of Maine Research Institute
 Nutrition Facts for Herring
 Prospecting herring waste – from ScienceNordic
 PNAS Population-scale sequencing reveals genetic differentiation due to local adaptation in Atlantic herring. 

Clupeidae
Seafood
Commercial fish
Oily fish
Fish common names